Andalucismo may refer to:
 Andalusian nationalism
 The artistic (especially musical) use of Andalusian styles or themes